Jose Antonio Gonzales Reyes (born February 25, 1987) is a Filipino professional basketball player for the Nueva Ecija Rice Vanguards of the Maharlika Pilipinas Basketball League (MPBL). He previously played for the Ateneo de Manila University where he spent his elementary, high school, and college years.

Reyes also hosted several television programs on GMA Network. He was formerly a host of For the Win, a sports talk segment of GMANews.tv. Prior to joining GMA Network, he also had a hosting stint on Studio 23.

Early life and collegiate career
Reyes first attended the Ateneo de Manila University in grade school. He then attended the same university in high school, where he played for the Ateneo Blue Eaglets. It was during this time when he first became well known as a scorer due to the two consecutive three-point shots he made which won Game 1 of the 2003 UAAP Juniors' Basketball Finals for the Eaglets. The following year, he led the Eaglets to another title and became a member of the Mythical Five as well as the Finals MVP.

He attended the Ateneo de Manila University Loyola Schools where he obtained a degree in Communications Technology Management and also played for the Ateneo Blue Eagles who he helped win back-to-back UAAP senior men's basketball championships from 2008 to 2009.

Professional career
He was drafted 18th overall in the 2010 PBA draft by the Powerade Tigers and played for the team until 2011. Afterwards, he played for the Cebuana Lhuillier Gems in the PBA Developmental League before moving to the Bangkok Cobras of the ABL.

PBA career statistics

Correct as of September 30, 2016

Season-by-season averages

|-
| align="left" | 
| align="left" | Powerade
| 21 || 10.3 || .309 || .267 || .812 || 1.3 || 1.3 || .3 || .0 || 2.6
|-
| align="left" | 
| align="left" | Talk 'N Text
| 4 || 15.8 || .308 || .250 || .889 || .5 || 1.8 || .8 || .0 || 4.8
|-
| align="left" | 
| align="left" | Talk 'N Text
| 25 || 5.6 || .298 || .281 || .833 || .5 || .4 || .3 || .1 || 1.7
|-
| align="left" | 
| align="left" | Talk 'N Text / Meralco
| 11 || 10.7 || .243 || .263 || .778 || .6 || .9 || .2 || .0 || 2.7
|-
| align="left" | 
| align="left" | Talk 'N Text
| 21 || 10.6 || .324 || .358 || .800 || 1.6 || .8 || .2 || .0 || 3.9
|-class=sortbottom
| align=center colspan=2 | Career
| 82 || 9.3 || .300 || .301 || .817 || 1.0 || .9 || .3 || .0 || 2.8

Off the court

Nicknames
Jai earned the nickname Jainamite  during his playing years in Ateneo due to his scoring ability. While playing for the Bangkok Cobras, he also became known as the Bangkok Mamba, an allusion to his current team's home city and to the "Black Mamba" nickname of Los Angeles Lakers swingman Kobe Bryant, whose father Joe Bryant is also the current head coach of the Cobras.

Media programs and television shows
(Includes current and former shows)

For the Win (GMANews.tv)
Unang Hirit (GMA Network)
Show Me Da Manny (GMA Network)
Pinoy Records (GMA Network)
 Wild Card (Studio 23)

References

1987 births
Living people
Filipino expatriate basketball people in Thailand
Filipino expatriate basketball people in Vietnam
Filipino men's basketball players
Filipino television personalities
Meralco Bolts players
Point guards
Powerade Tigers players
Saigon Heat players
Basketball players from Quezon City
TNT Tropang Giga players
Ateneo Blue Eagles men's basketball players
Maharlika Pilipinas Basketball League players
Barako Bull Energy draft picks